Darren Braithwaite (born 20 January 1969) is a retired British sprinter.

Braithwaite was a member of the British team which set a world indoor record for the rarely contested 4×200 metres relay on 3 March 1991 in Glasgow. Braithwaite and his teammates Linford Christie, Ade Mafe and John Regis ran a time of 1:22.11, which has yet to be bettered.

Braithwaite won a bronze medal in the 4×100 metres relay event at the 1991 World Athletics Championships in Tokyo (together with Tony Jarrett, John Regis and Linford Christie). He repeated this achievement at the 1997 World Athletics Championships in Athens (together with Darren Campbell, Douglas Walker and Julian Golding).

Braithwaite was the 100 metres champion at the AAA Championships in 1995.

Braithwaite now teaches physical education at Lammas School and Sports College in Leyton, and coaches the likes of Jordon Roberts London. His brother, Leon Braithwaite, is a former professional footballer, who played for Exeter City in the 1990s.

References

 British Olympic Committee

1969 births
Living people
British male sprinters
Olympic athletes of Great Britain
Athletes (track and field) at the 1996 Summer Olympics
World Athletics Championships athletes for Great Britain
World Athletics Championships medalists
World Athletics Indoor Championships medalists
European Athletics Championships medalists
World Athletics indoor record holders (relay)